Jonas Bevacqua (October 23, 1977 – May 30, 2011) was an American clothing designer and entrepreneur.

Early life
Jonas Gregory Bevacqua was born October 23, 1977, and was adopted into a family with six other adopted children of different races and ethnicities. He is of Vietnamese descent according to the Orange County Register reported in 2009.

Career
In 1999 he co-founded Lifted Research Group (LRG) with Robert Wright.

After Bevacqua dropped out of college and moved back home with his parents, he met fellow LRG founder Robert Wright when they were both working as DJs in Southern California clubs. Heavily influenced by Southern California's skateboard, surfing, and hip hop culture; Bevacqua and Wright started designing and making clothes that reflected their interests but were not available at the time.

By 2007 Entrepreneur placed LRG at No. 5 on its "Hot 500" list of fastest-growing companies, with 2006 sales coming in at $150 million.

Death
Jonas Bevacqua was found dead at his Laguna Beach home on May 31, 2011. He was 33 years old. In November 2011 Orange County Coroner's Office determined that Jonas Bevacqua died of natural causes.

Bevacqua is survived by his fiancée, son, parents and seven siblings.

References

1977 births
2011 deaths
American fashion designers
Place of birth missing
People from Orange County, California